West of the Divide is a 1934 American Western film directed by Robert N. Bradbury for Monogram, and starring John Wayne, Yakima Canutt and Gabby Hayes.

Plot
Ted Hayden poses as the deceased killer Gat Ganns in order to learn the identity of his father's murderer and to find his long-lost kid brother.

Cast
John Wayne as Ted Hayden, posing as Gat Ganns
Virginia Brown Faire as Fay Winters
George "Gabby" Hayes as "Dusty" Rhodes
Lloyd Whitlock as Mr. Gentry
Yakima Canutt as Hank (Gentry henchman)
Lafe McKee as Mr. Winters
Billy O'Brien as Spuds (later Jim Hayden)
Dick Dickinson as henchman Joe
Earl Dwire as sheriff

See also
John Wayne filmography

References

External links

1934 films
1934 Western (genre) films
1930s English-language films
American Western (genre) films
American black-and-white films
Films directed by Robert N. Bradbury
Monogram Pictures films
1930s American films